Sergey Brener (born 6 March 1971) is a Uzbekistani freestyle skier. He competed in the men's aerials event at the 1994 Winter Olympics.

References

1971 births
Living people
Uzbekistani male freestyle skiers
Olympic freestyle skiers of Uzbekistan
Freestyle skiers at the 1994 Winter Olympics
Place of birth missing (living people)
Asian Games medalists in freestyle skiing
Freestyle skiers at the 1996 Asian Winter Games
Asian Games bronze medalists for Uzbekistan
Medalists at the 1996 Asian Winter Games
20th-century Uzbekistani people